The Christ Of Nanjing is a 1995 erotic romantic drama film directed by Tony Au, starring Tony Leung Ka-fai and Yasuko Tomita.  The film is based on the work of famed Japanese novelist Akutagawa Ryunosuke.  Tomita won the award for best actress at 1995 Tokyo International Film Festival for her performance in the film.

Cast
Tony Leung Ka-fai as Ryuichiro Kagawa
Yasuko Tomita as Jin Hua
Tou Chung-hua as Tan Yong-nian
Jessica Chow as Cameila
Lau Shun as "Madame" of Lotus House
Kumi Nakamura as Ryuichiro's wife
Tong Bo-lin
Johnson Yuen as Xiaoer

Awards and nominations

External links

 

Hong Kong romantic drama films
Hong Kong erotic films
Japanese romantic drama films
Japanese erotic drama films
1990s Cantonese-language films
1990s Japanese-language films
Films about interracial romance
Films based on short fiction
1995 films
Romantic period films
Erotic romance films
Films based on Japanese novels
Films scored by Shigeru Umebayashi
1990s erotic drama films
Japanese multilingual films
Hong Kong multilingual films
1995 drama films
Films based on works by Ryūnosuke Akutagawa
1995 multilingual films
1990s Japanese films
1990s Hong Kong films